The superior ligament of the incus is a fibrous band that crosses from the body of the incus to the roof of the tympanic cavity just posterior to the superior ligament of the malleus. 

Ear
Ligaments